Independent Grocers of Australia (not to be confused by the American-owned Independent Grocers Alliance) is an Australian chain of supermarkets. The IGA brand is owned by Australian conglomerate Metcash under their Food & Grocery division, but individual IGA stores are owned and operated independently. Its main competitors are Woolworths, Coles and Aldi. IGA is the fourth largest supermarket chain in Australia, following Aldi overtaking Metcash in supermarket revenue.

Markets 
The IGA brand was introduced to Australia by Davids Holdings in 1988 when 10 stores became members of IGA. As of January 2020, there are over 1,400 IGA stores in Australia.

There are a wide variety of stores under the IGA banner, from small convenience stores, mid sized supermarkets, large full service supermarkets and liquor stores. In 2019, it was reported that IGA had 7% of the grocery market in Australia.In 2018, IGA began a rebrand that repositioned the chain as a uniquely local option, scrapping the white colour and corrugated metal for dark grey, SignWriting typography and handcrafted style icons. As part of the rebrand their slogan "How the locals like it" was changed to "Where the locals matter".

Brands 
IGA offers two Metcash store brand lines Black and Gold, a generic food and product brand and the higher quality Community Co., which links through with the IGA Community Chest program.
These brands are available at IGA and other Metcash supplied independent supermarkets.

See also

List of supermarket chains in Oceania

References

External links 

Supermarkets of Australia
Retail companies established in 1988
Australian companies established in 1988
Australian grocers